Teatro Ruth Escobar is a theatre in São Paulo, Brazil. It is named for the actress, Ruth Escobar, who founded the theater in 1963.

References

Theatres in São Paulo